E. Donald "Ed" Two-Rivers, sometimes known as Donald Two-River, was an Anishinaabe (Ojibwa) poet, playwright and spoken-word performer.

Brought up first on the reservation and then in the urban Native community in Chicago, Two-Rivers has been an activist for Native rights since the 1970s, for which he was awarded the Iron Eyes Cody Award for Peace in 1992.  He is also an accomplished poet, who has, among other honours, been awarded the American Book Award in 1992.  A critic of "victim politics", Two-Rivers is a strong supporter of programs that give disadvantaged Native peoples the chance to stand on their own two feet.

He had been critical of Euro-American directors and actors in the past, saying that "I believe that for non-Natives to perform a Native American play, they would first have to undergo a certain level of sensitivity training.  In fact, I would require it for any of my plays."

E. Donald Two-Rivers was the founding (Artistic Director) of the Chicago-based Red Path Theater Company.

In 2007, he returned to Chicago, to work on his last book In the Spirit of the Coyote.

He died December 27, 2008.

In 2009, a mosaic inspired by his poem "Indian Land Dancing" was dedicated in the Uptown neighborhood of Chicago: *

Bibliography

Plays
Chili Corn
Coyote Sits In Judgement
Forked Tongues
I Aint Tonto
No Honors Today
Old Indian Trick
Peeking Out Of Ameriks Museums
Pow-Wow Posse
Red Requiem - A Political Intrigue On City Streets
Shattered Dream
Sunka Cheslie (The Urban Pile)
Survivors Medicine
Whats Buzzin Cousin?
Winter Summit

Short story collections
Survivors' Medicine

Poetry anthologies
Pow-Wows and Fat Cats Mammoth 2003, available at www.mammothpublications.com
A Dozen Cold Ones by Two Rivers: Native American Poetry in an Urban Setting March Abrazo 1992

See also

List of writers from peoples indigenous to the Americas
Native American Studies

External links
Author's own website
Audio clips of Two-Rivers reading his own work
Obituary in Chicago Tribune
Obituary

Ojibwe people
American male poets
Year of birth missing
2008 deaths
Native American dramatists and playwrights
American male dramatists and playwrights
American dramatists and playwrights
American Book Award winners